KBDI may refer to:

 KBDI-TV, a television station (channel 12) licensed to Broomfield, Colorado, United States
 Keetch-Byram Drought Index